Handler or The Handler may refer to:

People

Occupations
 Handler, offensive player in Ultimate (sport)
 Animal handler, person who conducts animal training or is a wrangler
 Handler, a sport coach, agent or promoter
 Agent handling, person who manages a spy or agent of organizations in conflict such as nations and even groups and gangs involved in crusades, jihad, mass organized conversion rackets, etc.
 Baggage handler, a person who loads and unloads baggage and other cargo for transport via aircraft
 Mail handler, a postal worker
 Aircraft handler, a branch of the Fleet Air Arm/Royal Navy
 Garter handler, an old term for a pimp
 Political handler, an advisor and supporter of a politician

Persons named Handler
 Carole Handler, American attorney
 Chelsea Handler, American comedian and talk show host
 Daniel Handler, American author and musician
 Evan Handler,  American actor
 Evelyn Handler, 17th president of the University of New Hampshire
 Phil Handler, American football player and coach
 Rebecca Handler, American/Japanese actress
 Ruth Handler, American businesswoman
 Wolfgang Händler, German computer scientist

Computing 
 Handler, an asynchronous callback (computer programming) subroutine in computing
 A particular class of service process in DNIX
 A20 handler, the IBM PC memory manager software controlling access to the High Memory Area
 Event handler, a routine for processing a programming event
 Interrupt handler, a routine for processing CPU interrupts
 Signal handler, a routine for handling signals sent to a process
 Exception handling, a routine for handling software exceptions

Machines 
 Air handler, a device used as part of an HVAC (Heating, Ventilating, and Air Conditioning) system
 Handler, a robotic device used to automatically place a device under test into an automatic test equipment system
 Seismic Handler, an interactive analysis program for preferably continuous waveform data
 Telescopic handler, a machine widely used in agriculture and industry

Arts and entertainment 
 "The Handler", a short story by Ray Bradbury
 Handler (play), by Robert Schenkkan
 The Handler (Har Mar Superstar album), the third CD from American singer Har Mar Superstar
 Handler, a character class in Dragonlance
 The Handler (TV series)
 "The Handler", a song by British rock-band Muse on their 2015 album Drones (Muse album)

See also
 Hendler
Wrangler (disambiguation)